Goat Island is an island located on Lake Daniel in Stephens County, Texas.

References

Islands of Texas
Landforms of Stephens County, Texas